Nothing to Prove is an EP by Nigerian singer and songwriter Victor AD. It was released on July 30, 2021, through RED EYE.

Background
The 6-track EP has a running time of 17 minutes and features Mr Eazy on "Black", Phyno on "Anymore", and Lava Lava on "Joanna".

The sound production was done by Kulboy(tracks 1,2,4 and 5) and Vibo(tracks 3 and 6)

Reception

Pulse Ng rated the EP 8.0/10, stating that it is a beautiful EP with high replay value.

Waploaded reviewed the EP and gave it a rating of 4/5.

Track listing

References

2021 EPs
Afrobeats albums